This is a list of regions of the Republic of Tajikistan by Human Development Index as of 2023 with data for the year 2021.

See also 
 List of countries by Human Development Index

References 

Tajikistan
Tajikistan
Human Development Index
Regions By Human Development Index